Chroniclers of the musical theater have been around for years, collecting  pictorial surveys, librettos and scores, and recording the careers of various theatrical celebrities.  Nothing in the American musical theater has been more inaccessible, however, than the record of its dance traditions, and there are many to recount.  

For the most part, dance movement itself was either the last to be mentioned by critics or ignored altogether, resulting in  dance numbers in musicals going unrecorded.  The only way to preserve dance movements from generation to generation was by demonstration, imitation, practice, and personal supervision.  

Not until 1960, with the musical Bye Bye Birdie, did the permanent notation of a show's complete choreography exist.

History

In the late 1920s, the importance of dance in a musical changed.  Seymour Felix realized dance needed to aid in plot and character development as well as enhance the spirit of the show. Having convinced Florenz Ziegfeld, the producer of Whoopee!, that it is the story that counts, Felix set about to devise dances that unfolded gradually and consisted of plot development and climax as if they were dramatic units themselves instead of "a mere pounding of the feet and kicking to music."

The major step of integrating dance into a unified effect onstage were vital and ingenuous for commercial dancing. One of the earliest successful examples of this concept was in Pal Joey. The dancing in the show enhanced the environment and projected character without any reduction in the flashy entertainment values then prized in musical shows.

Famous director-choreographers

When it was realized the importance of dancing as a tool for character development and plot advancement, famous director-choreographers began to emerge:  Jerome Robbins, Bob Fosse, and Gower Champion.  

Robbins believed whoever controlled the movement controlled the show.  This was definitely evident in West Side Story when Robbins allowed the choreography and the intense, adolescent passion of a teenage boy in love to move him.  When Robbins abandoned commercial dance to pursue a career in choreography with the New York City Ballet, Bob Fosse took up the cause and argued the case for director-choreographers with shows like Sweet Charity, Pippin, Chicago, and Dancin'''.

Fosse had a talent for manipulating, tampering with, or otherwise reconstructing the contribution from writers in order to make the material serviceable to his staging and choreography.  Fosse's style of self-contained acts of vaudeville and burlesque led him to a career of show-stopping numbers for audience approval.  

Champion wasn’t as personal as Fosse, or as material-oriented as Robbins, but nonetheless, his craft and work sustained the old-fashioned musical comedy scene for two decades, 1960 with Bye Bye Birdie to 1980 with 42nd Street''.  Champion used dancing to embellish, extend and enlarge an existing emotion.  He was no innovator, like Robbins.  He never created his own distinctive style, like Fosse.  Yet, Champion's body of work is as much a part of the history of the contemporary musical as that of his talented peers.

References

See also
Dramatic structure
Tony Award for Best Choreography
Musical theatre
Broadway theatre

 

Broadway, Choreography on
Musical theatre
Broadway theatre